
Royal Victoria is a reference to Queen Victoria and may refer to:

Places 
 Royal Victoria Place, Tunbridge Wells

Parks 
See Royal Victoria Park (disambiguation)
 Royal Victoria Park, Bath
 Royal Victoria Country Park, Netley, previously the site of the Royal Victoria Military Hospital

Hospitals 
See Royal Victoria Hospital (disambiguation)

General hospitals
 Royal Victoria Hospital, Folkestone, England (established 1846)
 Royal Victoria Hospital, Belfast, Northern Ireland (established 1873), the first (1906) air-conditioned building in the world
 Royal Victoria Hospital, Bournemouth, England (established 1889)
 Royal Victoria Hospital, Dundee, Scotland (established 1899)
 Royal Victoria Regional Health Centre, formerly the Royal Victoria Hospital, Barrie, Ontario, Canada (established 1891)
 Royal Victoria Hospital, Montreal, Quebec, Canada (established 1893)
 Royal Victoria Hospital, Edinburgh, Scotland (established 1894)
 Royal Victoria Infirmary, Newcastle upon Tyne, England (established 1751 as the Newcastle Infirmary, expanded and renamed in 1906)

Specialist hospitals
 Royal Victoria Military Hospital, or Netley Hospital, Hampshire, England (established 1856)
 Royal Victoria Eye and Ear Hospital, Bournemouth, England (established 1887)
 Royal Victoria Eye and Ear Hospital, Dublin, Ireland (established 1897)

Others 
 Royal Victorian Order
 Royal Victoria Dock, in London
 Royal Victoria DLR station
 Royal Victoria Regiment, Australian Army
 , lost 1864
 GoodLife Fitness Victoria Marathon, previously the Royal Victoria Marathon, Vancouver Island